This article lists those who were potential candidates for the Democratic nomination for Vice President of the United States in the 1948 election. At the 1948 Democratic National Convention, President Harry S. Truman won nomination for a full term. Truman had become president upon the death of his predecessor and 1944 running mate, Franklin D. Roosevelt. As the 25th Amendment had not yet been passed, there was no method for filling a vice presidential vacancy, and Truman served without a vice president during his first term. Truman's nomination faced significant opposition from the South, as did the party's platform on civil rights. Though Truman attempted to convince Supreme Court Justice William O. Douglas to join the ticket, Douglas declined. Truman instead selected Senate Minority Leader Alben W. Barkley, the preferred choice of many Democratic delegates, and a border state Senator who could appeal to both the Northern and Southern wings of the party. The Truman–Barkley ticket won the 1948 election, defeating the Republican (Dewey–Warren), Progressive (Wallace–Taylor), and Dixiecrat (Thurmond–Wright) tickets.

Candidates

Finalists
Senate Minority Leader Alben W. Barkley of Kentucky
Supreme Court Justice William O. Douglas (declined)

Others
Secretary of Defense James Forrestal
Secretary of Commerce Averell Harriman
Supreme Court Justice Robert H. Jackson
Massachusetts Representative John W. McCormack
Wyoming Senator Joseph C. O'Mahoney
Georgia Senator Richard Russell, Jr.

See also
1948 Democratic National Convention

References

Vice presidency of the United States
Harry S. Truman
Alben W. Barkley
1948 United States presidential election